The Ministry of Health and Welfare (MOHW) is the Executive Yuan ministry responsible for the administration of the public health system, social welfare, affordable and universal health care, hospitals, pharmaceutical, immunization programs, disease prevention, supervision and coordination of local health agencies in Taiwan.

History

The ministry was originally established on 17 March 1971 as the Department of Health (DOH). The department was upgraded to Ministry of Health and Welfare on 23 July 2013 with the addition from the agencies in the Ministry of the Interior responsible for social welfare following restructuring of the Executive Yuan.

The original building of the MOHW was located at Datong District, Taipei when it was still named the Department of Health and being renamed Ministry of Health and Welfare. The Executive Yuan approved the construction for the new building of the then Department of Health in 2007 at Nangang District, Taipei. After years of planning and construction, the building was finally completed in May 2014. On 18 June 2014, the opening ceremony of the new MOHW building was attended by President Ma Ying-jeou, legislators, and representatives from various government agencies and related organizations.

Organizational structure

Political departments
 Department of Planning
 Department of Social Insurance
 Department of Social Assistance and Social Work
 Department of Protective Service
 Department of Nursing and Health Care
 Department of Medical Affairs
 Department of Mental Health
 Department of Oral Health
 Department of Chinese Medicine and Pharmacy

Administrative departments
 Department of Secretarial Affairs
 Department of Personnel
 Department of Civil Service Ethics
 Department of Accounting
 Department of Statistics
 Department of Information Management
 Legal Affairs Committee
 Hospital and Social Welfare Organizations Administration Commission
 National Health Insurance Administration
 National Health Insurance Dispute Mediation Committee
 Health and Welfare Workers Training Center
 Office of International Cooperation
 National Pension Supervisory Committee

Agencies
 Social and Family Affairs Administration
 Centers for Disease Control
 Food and Drug Administration
 Health Promotion Administration
 National Health Insurance Administration

List of Ministers

Transportation
The MOHW building is accessible within walking distance East from Kunyang Station of Taipei Metro.

See also
 Centers for Disease Control (Taiwan)
 Healthcare in Taiwan
 National Health Research Institutes (Taiwan)
 Pharmaceutical Affairs Law (Taiwan)
 Executive Yuan

References

External links 
 

1971 establishments in Taiwan
Health and Welfare
Taiwan
Taiwan
China, Health and Welfare